Crinum bulbispermum is a herbaceous plant native to South Africa, Lesotho and Eswatini. It is naturalized in the Lesser Antilles, Honduras, Cuba, Florida, Texas, Louisiana, Alabama, South Carolina and North Carolina. Crinum bulbispermum is the floral emblem of the Free State province of South Africa.

Description
The plant grows from large bulbs. It has strap shaped leaves, 50–88 cm long. The inflorescence is an umbel with 8–13 flowers, borne on a scape 40–75 cm tall. The flowers are funnel shaped and sickly-sweet scented, and are usually pink with a deep pink or red midstripe, but can range from white to red. Flowering takes place in spring and summer. The plant thrives in wet places.

Cultivars and hybrids
There are some cultivars in cultivation:
'Alba' - pure white flowers. 
'Backup Mother' - vigorous. Flowers medium pink with white throat.
'Spotty' - flowers rose-purple with odd random white spots and unpigmented, short stripes. Bred by Hannibal.

The species has also been used in a number of hybrids commonly cultivated.
Crinum × herbertii G.Don ex Loud. (C. bulbispermum × C. scabrum)
Crinum × powellii hort. ex Baker (C. bulbispermum × C. moorei) The most hardy of all Crinum species.

Cultivation and uses
This is one of the most commonly cultivated species, grown as an ornamental plant for its flowers. It is best grown in deep soils that receive and hold a lot of water during the growing season and should be left to grow in the same place without disturbance for many years. Plants require full sun. They also make good container plants. The species is hardy to USDA zone 6 or −10 °C if the bulb is protected. Propagation is by division or seeds. Seedlings will flower in their third or fourth year.

References

bulbispermum
Flora of Southern Africa
Garden plants
Plants described in 1768
Taxa named by Nicolaas Laurens Burman